Ray Daniel is an author of Boston-based crime fiction and is the author of the Tucker Mysteries.

His short stories “Give Me a Dollar” won a 2014 Derringer Award for short fiction and “Driving Miss Rachel” was chosen as a 2013 distinguished short story by Otto Penzler, editor of The Best American Mystery Stories 2013.

Novels

References

1962 births
Living people
21st-century American novelists
American male novelists
American mystery writers
American short story writers
Writers from Boston
21st-century American male writers
Novelists from Massachusetts